Jahangirnagar University School and College shortly known as JUSC was established in 1972. It was enlarged and renamed in 1988.

Administration

It is maintained by a governing body headed by the Vice Chancellor of Jahangirnagar University.

Students and teachers 
 It enrolls more than 3000 students, while employing over 100 teachers and 30 administrative staff. The institution operates from 1st grade to 12th grade.

Campus 
The campus is notable for the variety of migratory birds in winter. The principal of the college is Jolil bhuia.

References 

https://en.m.wikipedia.org/wiki/Bangladesh_Chhatra_League

Schools in Dhaka District

- Wikipedia